The 1904–05 season was Madrid Football Club's 3rd season in existence. The club played some friendly matches against local clubs. They also played in the Campeonato de Madrid (Madrid Championship) and the Copa del Rey.

Madrid FC remained unbeaten throughout the season winning both the Campeonato de Madrid and the Copa del Rey for the first time. The only match the club did not win was a 1–1 draw in a friendly against Athletic Club Sucursal de Madrid. Madrid FC defeated Athletic Bilbao in the Copa del Rey final securing the first official title in the club's history.

Summary
 13 November: The first ever match between Madrid FC and Atlético Madrid was held.
 21 May: Real Madrid was a founding member of the Fédération Internationale de Football Association (FIFA)
 18 April: Madrid FC defeated Athletic Bilbao in the Copa del Rey final thanks to a goal by Manuel Prast. This was the first official title in the history of the club.

Friendlies

Competitions

Overview

Campeonato de Madrid

Copa del Rey

Notes

References

External links
Realmadrid.com Official Site

Real Madrid
Real Madrid CF seasons